Waas is a surname. Notable people with the surname include:

Herbert Waas (born 1963), German footballer
Les Waas, creator of the Mister Softee jingle
Murray Waas (born 1971), American investigative journalist
Uli Waas (born 1949), German writer and illustrator